is a Japanese professional racing driver. A native of Fukuoka, he has notably raced in Formula 3, Formula 3000 and Formula Nippon, as well as Super GT.

Career
Yamamoto began his single-seater career in 1993 by participating in the Japanese Formula 3 Championship. He participated in nine races without scoring a single point.

The following year, he left for Germany to race in the national Formula 3 Championship with the WTS-TKF Racing team. He ranked twenty-sixth with 2 points. He also competed in the Formula 3 Masters at Circuit Zandvoort, finishing twenty-third on behalf of WTS Motorsport.

In 1995 he returned to Japan to participate in the Formula 3000 Championship with X Japan Racing Team Le Mans. He came ninth with 9 points, having been on the podium once at Sportsland Sugo. Thanks to these results Yamamoto obtained a test for Pacific Grand Prix in Formula 1. He was set to participate in the Japanese and Pacific Grands Prix for the sum of 1.2 million dollars, but was not granted a Super Licence and his plan to race in Formula 1 fell through.

He then took refuge in the Formula Nippon championship and the Anabuki Dome Mugen team. He scored a point in 1996 and finished seventeenth in the standings.

In 1997 Yamamoto entered the All-Japan GT Championship in the GT500 class with Mugen & Dome Project's Honda NSX. He scored 11 points, achieved a pole position and finished sixteenth in the championship. At the same time, he returned to Formula Nippon, this time with the Navi Connection Racing Team. His only achievement would be a fastest lap at Mine Circuit, as he failed to score points in any of the ten races.

In 1998 he participated in a JGTC race in the GT300 category with the Toyota Celica of Racing Project Bandoh and stepped on the podium on this occasion. This came at the final round of the season at Sportsland Sugo, after he had once again contested the first five in GT500 with Dome Racing and their Honda NSX. He ranked fifteenth in GT500 and nineteenth in GT300.

Racing record

Japanese Top Formula Championship results

Complete JGTC results

References 

1973 births
Japanese racing drivers
Sportspeople from Fukuoka Prefecture
Japanese Formula 3 Championship drivers
Japanese Formula 3000 Championship drivers
Living people
Formula Nippon drivers

Mugen Motorsports drivers
Team LeMans drivers